Howard J. Morrison (born 1932) is a game designer, who designed the game Simon with Ralph H. Baer while working for Marvin Glass at Marvin Glass and Associates.

With the closure of Marvin Glass and Associates, in 1988, Morrison and his partners Jeffrey Breslow and Roben Terzian went on to start the design firm Breslow, Morrison, Terzian & Associates (BMT; now 'Big Monster Toys,' and were subsequently inducted into the Toy Industry Association Hall of Fame in 1998. 

Some of their best selling products include: The Animal, Ants in the Pants, Guesstures (originally named Gestures), Brain Warp, California Roller Baby, Real Talking Bubba, Masterpiece, My Size Barbie, Casey Cartwheel, Jennie Gymnast, Hot Wheels Criss Cross Crash and many more.

References

1932 births
Living people
Place of birth missing (living people)
American designers
Toy inventors